Putain is a French vulgarity meaning "whore" or "fuck".

Putain may also to:

 La Putain respectueuse (English: The Respectful Prostitute), a 1952 French film
 Putain de camion, a 1988 studio album by Renaud
 "Putain putain", a song from TC Matic's 1983 album Choco